Sons of the Devil is an ongoing creator-owned psychological horror genre American comic book series written by Brian Buccellato with art by Toni Infante. Image Comics began publication for 'Sons of the devil' on 27 May 2015. Brian Buccellato also created a short film to go along with the comics.

Publication history
Sons of the Devil was crowd funded via the kickstarter website. 221 backers pledged $24,042 to bring the project to fruition.

Plot
Sons of the devil unfolds over three decades following Travis, just an average guy, until he discovers his family has ties to a deadly cult. Travis decides its best to just move on with life a friend is suspiciously murdered. Everything changed when his girlfriend drew the attention of a killer by chasing clues about Travis' family.

Characters

Main characters
Travis Crowe
Melissa

Supporting characters
Detective Wade Pope
Henry Mills
Tilly
Vanessa

Villains
David Daly
Jennifer
Eric Burton
Dark Lord, cult master

Other characters
Aaron Wilkes
Seth
Detective Young
Klay Landon
Robby Doyle

In other media

Film
The 'Sons of the devil' kickstarter project also stated a 10-15 minute short film was produced to go along with the comics.

Collected editions

External links
 Sons of the Devil at Image Comics
 Sons of the Devil at Comic Vine
 Comic Book DB

References

Image Comics
2015 comics debuts
Comics publications